Koubéogo may refer to:

 Koubéogo, Boulgou, Burkina Faso
 Koubéogo, Ganzourgou, Burkina Faso